Dhane Smith (born January 22, 1992) is a  professional lacrosse player for the Buffalo Bandits of the National Lacrosse League and the Victoria Shamrocks of the Western Lacrosse Association, as well as Chaos Lacrosse Club in the Premier Lacrosse League. Smith began his career in 2009 with the Kitchener-Waterloo Braves of the Ontario Junior A Lacrosse League, where he won the Green Gael Trophy as the league's MVP in 2012. Smith eventually moved up to the Kitchener-Waterloo Kodiaks of Major Series Lacrosse, and was transferred to the Shamrocks during the 2014 season.

Smith was drafted fifth overall by the Bandits in the 2012 NLL Entry Draft. He began his NLL career as a transition player, but eventually switched to forward. He ranked third on the Bandits in scoring in both 2013 and 2014. In 2016, he set a Bandits record for most goals in a season and set the NLL single-season record for most points in a season.

Smith played for Chaos in the inaugural season of the Premier Lacrosse League, recording four points in five regular season games, and an additional four points in two playoff games.

Smith won a gold medal at the 2019 World Indoor Lacrosse Championships for Canada.

Heading into the 2023 NLL season, Inside Lacrosse ranked Smith the #1 best forward in the NLL.

Early life
Smith grew up in the heart of Kitchener. A lacrosse player from birth, he later in life transitioned into hockey and football, where he reached elite levels in both. Known by many as a multi-sport athlete, Smith led his high school football team to a championship final while running the offence as a gunslinging mobile quarterback.

Smith is a cousin of former NLL Defensive Player of the Year Billy Dee Smith.
Smith declined several offers from NCAA universities and instead declared for the 2012 NLL draft.

Career Stats 
NLL:

PLL:

International:

Awards and achievements

 2016 NLL MVP
 2016 NLL All-League First Team
 2013 NLL All Rookie Team
 Holds Buffalo Bandits single season records for goals (72, 2016) and assists (70, 2019)
2021 PLL Second Team All-Pro
2021 PLL Champion
2022 NLL MVP
2022 NLL All-League First Team

References

External links
NLL stats at pointstreak.com
NLL.com bio

1992 births
Living people
Canadian lacrosse players
Lacrosse people from Ontario
Sportspeople from Kitchener, Ontario
Buffalo Bandits players
Premier Lacrosse League players
Lacrosse forwards
Lacrosse midfielders
Lacrosse transitions
Canadian expatriate lacrosse people in the United States
Conestoga College alumni
Competitors at the 2022 World Games
World Games gold medalists